Walther van den Ende (born 29 June 1947) is a Belgian cinematographer. He contributed to more than sixty films since 1975 including No Man's Land, Joyeux Noël and The Eighth Day.

References

External links 

1947 births
Living people
Belgian cinematographers
European Film Award for Best Cinematographer winners